Carboxypeptidase A2 is an enzyme that in humans is encoded by the CPA2 gene.

Three different forms of human pancreatic procarboxypeptidase A have been isolated. The A1 and A2 forms are monomeric proteins with different biochemical properties. The A2 form of pancreatic procarboxypeptidase acts on aromatic C-terminal residues

References

Further reading

External links
 The MEROPS online database for peptidases and their inhibitors: M14.002
 

EC 3.4.17